Ketan Patel (also known as Ketan Rajnibhai Patel) is an Indian pharmacist chairman of Troikaa Pharmaceuticals, a Gujarat based pharmaceutical company.

Education & career
Patel is a Gold Medalist during his Bachelor of Pharmacy and Master of Pharmacy programs from L. M. College of Pharmacy, Ahmedabad. He has a Ph.D. in Pharmaceutical Technology from Dharamsinh Desai University, Gujarat.

Patel instituted the “Rajnibhai.V. Patel Pharmlnnova Award” under the aegis of Department of Science and Technology (India).

He is the Chairman of Board of Governors, NIPER, Ahmedabad and Member of Academic Council, Gujarat Forensic Sciences University. He is also a member of Board of Governors – Gujarat Technological University

His journey of innovation can be find in a book names ‘THE INNOVATORS’, published by the Department of Science and Technology (India) Government of India.

Membership and Boards
Patel is the Chairman of the Board of Governors at National Institute of Pharmaceutical Education & Research (NIPER), Gandhinagar. He is also a member of Academic Council, National Forensic Sciences University, Ahmedabad (previously known as Gujarat Forensic Sciences University).

He is the member of the Board of Governors at Gujarat Technological University, Ahmedabad. He is a member of the Board of Directors, i-HUB, one of the biggest startup institutes set up by the Government of Gujarat.

Invention
Patel is the primary inventor & patent holder of a painless diclofenac injection under the brand name – ‘DYNAPAR-AQ’ by Troikaa Pharmaceuticals Ltd. For this Government of India’s Department of Science & Industrial Research also conferred National Award in 2008.

In 2008, he invented a quick penetrating solution of Diclofenac for topical administration known as 'DYNAPAR QPS', for which he was conferred National Award in 2015 by Department of Science & Technology, Govt of India.

Publications
PENETRATION OF DICLOFENAC FROM NOVEL QUICK PENETRATING SOLUTION. A COMPARATIVE SCINTIGRAPHY STUDY WITH GEL, Sanjaykumar H. Maroo, Ketan R. Patel and Aseem Bhatnagar, International Journal of Pharma & Science Res.2013;5(4):175-178
A Comparative Dermal Microdialysis Study of Diclofenac QPS versus Conventional 1% Diclofenac Gel, Sanjay Kumar H. Maroo1*, Ketan R. Patel, Vipul Prajapati, Rajen Shah, Milind Bagul, ISSN 0975-248X, 2013, vol5, issue4
Comparison of Heparin Quick Penetrating Solution and Diclofenac Quick Penetrating Solution for the Prevention of Superficial Thrombophlebitis Caused by Peripheral Venous Cannulation: A Randomized Double-Blind Study, Akhileshwar and Swati Singh, doi: 10.4103/aer.AER_189_18, 2019 Jan-Mar; 13(1): 155–157, 
Evaluation of Skin Penetration of Diclofenac from a Novel Topical Non Aqueous Solution: A Comparative Bioavailability Study, Manish Nivsarkar, Sanjaykumar Maroo, Ketan R Patel, Dixit D Patel, ISSN: 0975-8232, 2017

References

Living people
Indian scientists
Pharmacists
Indian businesspeople
Dharamsinh Desai University alumni
Year of birth missing (living people)